Cibotium barometz, the barometz, golden chicken fern or woolly fern, is a species of tree fern native to parts of China and to the western part of the Malay Peninsula. The fern's woolly rhizome was thought to be the inspiration for the mythical "Vegetable Lamb of Tartary".

Description and distribution
Cibotium barometz has been classified in the fern family Dicksoniaceae and is one of a small number of tree fern species that Carl Linnaeus initially placed in the fern family Polypodiaceae in his Species Plantarum.

The sori are marginal on the pinnules.

The species is a folk medicinal herb in common use. It was thought to be the mythical Vegetable Lamb of Tartary during the Middle Ages due to the resemblance of its woolly rhizomes to a lamb. Although it is widely distributed, the plant has been extensively collected in Southeast Asia, causing the decline in the population size and number of individuals.

References

barometz
Ferns of Asia
Flora of China
Flora of Indo-China
Flora of Malesia